Major Robert Allen Jr. (April 13, 1896 – March 30, 1947) was an American baseball second baseman in the Negro leagues. He played with the Brooklyn Royal Giants, Lincoln Giants, and Baltimore Black Sox from 1919 to 1922. He attended Howard University.

References

External links
  and Seamheads

Howard University alumni
Baltimore Black Sox players
Brooklyn Royal Giants players
Lincoln Giants players
1896 births
1947 deaths
Baseball players from New Haven, Connecticut
Baseball second basemen
20th-century African-American sportspeople